Marcel Nancey was a French journalist, dramatist and theater manager for many Parisian entertainment venues including the galerie Vivienne (1902-1903), the Théâtre Moderne (1901-1903), the Théâtre des Bouffes-Parisiens (1903-1904), the Opéra-Bouffe (1904), the Théâtre Mondain (1906-1914), the Little-Palace (1910-1919), the Théâtre Comœdia (1920-1945), the Théâtre des Deux-Masques (1921-1923), the Théâtre du Moulin-Bleu and again the Théâtre des Deux-Masques (1935-1937).

Some works 
 1903: Le Billet de faveur, comedy in one act, Fantaisies-Parisiennes (September)
 1904: Le Truc du Brésilien, comédie en vaudevilles in four acts in collaboration with Paul Armont, Théâtre de Cluny (12 October)
 1912: La Part du feu, comedy in four acts in collaboration with André Mouëzy-Éon, Théâtre des Bouffes-Parisiens (24 December)
 1916: La Ventouse, comedy in one act in collaboration with Jean Manoussi, Théâtre du Grand-Guignol (November)
 1919: La Peau, play in one act in collaboration with André Birabeau, Théâtre du Grand-Guignol (14 March)
 1927: La Vénus de Deauville, operetta in three acts by Alain Monjardin, lyrics by A. Monjardin, Marcel Nancey and Léo Demars, music by Sylvabell-Demars, Théâtre Comœdia (30 May)

External links 
 Les Archives du spectacle

20th-century French dramatists and playwrights
French theatre managers and producers
Place of birth missing
Place of death missing
Year of birth missing
Year of death missing